Sehlen is a municipality in the Vorpommern-Rügen district, in Mecklenburg-Vorpommern, Germany.

References

External links

Official website of Sehlen

Towns and villages on Rügen